The snakeskin gourami (Trichopodus pectoralis) is a species of gourami native to Southeast Asia. Prior to the merging of Belontidae to the family Osphronemidae, the snakeskin gourami was regarded as the largest member of its family. It is still the largest species in its genus and subfamily.

Etymology
The name Trichopodus comes from the Ancient Greek words θρίξ (thríx) which means hair and πούς (poús) which means foot while pectoralis comes from the Latin words pectus which means "chest" and ālis which means "of or pertaining to", refers to the large pectoral fins of the species.

Physical characteristics

The snakeskin gourami is an elongated, moderately compressed fish with a small dorsal fin. Its anal fin is nearly the length of the body and the pelvic fins are long and thread-like. The back is olive in color and the flanks are greenish gray with a silver iridescence. An obvious, irregular black band extends from the snout, through the eye, and to the caudal peduncle. The underparts are white. The rear part of the body may be marked with faint transverse stripes. The fins are also gray-green, and the iris of the eye may be amber under favorable water conditions. The dorsal fins of male fish are pointed and the pelvic fins are orange to red. The males are also slimmer than the less colorful females. Juvenile snakeskin gouramis have strikingly strong zig-zag lines from the eye to the base of the tail.

Distribution and habitat
They are common in the Mekong and Chao Phraya basin of, Thailand mainly,  Southern Vietnam, Laos, and lastly Cambodia. They have also been introduced in the Philippines, Malaysia, Indonesia, Singapore, Papua New Guinea, Sri Lanka, and New Caledonia.

Snakeskin gourami are found in rice paddies, shallow ponds, and swamps. They are found in shallow, sluggish, or standing water habitats with a lot of aquatic vegetation. It also occurs in flooded forests of the lower Mekong, and gradually moves back to rivers as floodwaters recede.

Ecology
Snakeskin gourami generally feeds on aquatic insects and other small living organisms in its habitat. Like other labyrinth fish, it can breathe air directly, as well as absorb oxygen from water through its gills.

Relationship to humans
Compared to other gourami species, the snakeskin gourami is less frequently sold as aquarium fish but is more commonly used as food fish in their native lands. The snakeskin gourami is a highly economical species that is captured and cultured for food and for export for the aquarium trade. It is one of the five most important aquacultured freshwater species in Thailand. Its flesh is of good quality, and may be fried, grilled or used for fish soup, like tom yam. In Thailand, there is a trade of dried snakeskin gourami for the benefit of people in areas where the live fish is not available.

Famous areas for snakeskin gourami farming in Thailand are Bang Bo and Bang Phli Districts in Samut Prakan Province with Don Kamyan Sub-District in Mueang Suphan Buri District, Suphan Buri Province, but the area with the largest number of farms is Ban Phaeo District, Samut Sakhon Province. All of these are in the central region.

In the aquarium
Trichopodus pectoralis are a hardy species recommended for a beginner in the fishkeeping hobby because, despite growing to a relatively large size, they are peaceful fish that can be kept in a community tank. They can be mixed with barbs, danios, tetras, Corydoras, angelfish, loaches, Loricariids and other gourami.

A snakeskin gourami is a bottom and middle tank level dweller. It requires at least a 36inches (91 cm) length aquarium. A normal specimen should be kept in at least a 36-inches (91 cm) or 40gallon (151liter) tank to help them grow and thrive in a regular conditions, as a minimum tank size. The recommended pH is 5.8 to 8.5 with a water hardness of 2 to 30 dH and a temperature of 72 to 86 °F (22–30 °C). A snakeskin gourami can grow up to 8 inches (20 cm) in captivity and its spawns are also unusually large.

Snakeskin gouramies, being omnivores, eat live food such as Tubifex worms, insects, insect larvae and crustaceans. They also consume flakes, pellets, chopped spinach and lettuce. They are not picky and will accept any food offered.

Breeding snakeskin gourami is not difficult. They will breed when they reach 5 inches (12.5 cm) length.  It is the most prolific among all the gourami species.  There can be as many as 5,000 fry from a single spawning period.  The males are relatively nonaggressive, even at spawning times, which is unlike other labyrinth fishes. The parents will also not eat the fry. Fry can be raised by feeding progressively larger flake foods, in accordance with the size of the fry; occasionally feeding of live foods such as newly hatched brine shrimp is a welcome change in their diet.  During breeding, like some of other labyrinth species, snakeskin gouramies are observed to vocalize sounds described as croaking, growling or cracking tones, to demonstrate territorial behavior.

References

Further reading

Snakeskin gourami
Commercial fish
Fauna of Southeast Asia
Fishkeeping
Fish described in 1910